A civil ensign is an ensign (maritime flag) used by civilian vessels to denote their nationality. It can be the same or different from the state ensign and the naval ensign (or war ensign). It is also known as the merchant ensign or merchant flag. Some countries have special civil ensigns for yachts, and even for specific yacht clubs, known as yacht ensigns.

Most countries have only one national flag and ensign for all purposes. In other countries, a distinction is made between the land flag and the civil, state and naval ensigns. The British ensigns, for example, differ from the flag used on land (the Union Flag) and have different versions of plain and defaced Red and Blue ensigns for civilian and state use, as well as the naval ensign (White Ensign) that can also be used by yachts of the Royal Yacht Squadron.

Countries having specific civil ensigns 
The civil ensigns that are different from the general national flag can be grouped into a number of categories.

Civil ensigns with the national flag in the canton
Several countries use red flags with, in most cases, either the respective national flag or the Union Flag in the canton, patterned after the Red Ensign. British overseas territories fly the plain Red Ensign or a Red Ensign with the respective colonial arms in the fly. Saudi Arabia puts its national flag in the canton of an otherwise-green flag (the Saudi Arabian flag is hoisted with the flagpole to its right so the canton is in the upper right corner of the flag). Ghana stopped using its Red Ensign in 2003 with the adoption of a new merchant shipping act, which made the Ghanaian flag the proper national colors for Ghanaian ships. Similarly, Sri Lanka stopped using its Red Ensign in 1969 and uses the Sri Lankan flag as the civil ensign. Under the relevant shipping law for the Solomon Islands, the Shipping Act 1998, (No. 5 of 1998), the national flag of the Solomon Islands and not a Red Ensign is the appropriate flag: "The National Flag of Solomon Islands shall be the national colours for a vessel registered under this Act."

Sovereign states

British overseas territories and crown dependencies

Civil ensigns that vary greatly from the national flag
Several countries have civil ensigns that are very different from the national flag.

Civil ensigns consisting of the national flag with an additional emblem
Well-known examples are the Italian civil ensign showing the shield with the arms of the sea republics, and the Polish civil ensign with the arms of Poland. Most of these emblems were added to distinguish the ensign from similar flags of other countries (e.g. Colombia/Ecuador) or from other signal flags (e.g. Malta/ H signal flag).

Civil ensigns that are simplified national flags with coat of arms removed
In several countries (such as Spain and much of Hispanic America, and some European countries), there are two main versions of the flag, a simpler one (usually a striped flag) and a more elaborate one with the national arms. The simpler one is used as a civil ensign (and in most cases also as a civil flag), whereas the version with the arms is mainly used by the government and the military. In El Salvador, the civil ensign also differs from the national flag in the proportions.

Civil ensigns differing from the national flag in the proportions 
Several former British colonies use 1:2 as a proportion for their ensigns and 3:5 for flags ashore, whereas Slovenia, Croatia and Hungary have it the other way around, with ensigns at 2:3 and flags ashore at 1:2. France is a special case: the overall proportion is the same, but the bands on the ensign differ in width slightly.

Former civil ensigns no longer in current use or obsolete

See also
 Civil and merchant ensigns
 Civil flag
 Civil air ensign

Remarks

Civil ensigns
Types of flags